Diogo Costa Pinto (born 29 June 1999) is a Portuguese professional footballer who plays for Casa Pia as a midfielder.

Football career
Born in Tomar, Pinto made his professional debut with Benfica B in a 4–0 away loss to Vilafranquense in LigaPro on 18 August 2019.

On 13 January 2020 he was acquired by Ascoli.

On 5 October 2020 he joined Serie C club Potenza on loan.

On 26 January 2021 he was loaned to Vilafranquense.

On 7 July 2021 he signed a two-year contract with Estrela da Amadora.

References

External links

1999 births
People from Tomar
Sportspeople from Santarém District
Living people
Portuguese footballers
Portugal youth international footballers
Association football midfielders
U.F.C.I. Tomar players
Sporting CP footballers
U.D. Leiria players
S.L. Benfica B players
Ascoli Calcio 1898 F.C. players
Potenza Calcio players
U.D. Vilafranquense players
C.F. Estrela da Amadora players
Casa Pia A.C. players
Liga Portugal 2 players
Serie B players
Serie C players
Primeira Liga players
Portuguese expatriate footballers
Expatriate footballers in Italy
Portuguese expatriate sportspeople in Italy